Mubende–Kakumiro–Kibaale–Kagadi Road is a road in Uganda's Central Region and Western Region, connecting the towns of Mubende in Mubende District to Kakumiro, Kibaale and Kagadi in Kibaale District.

Location

The coordinates of the road near Kibaale are 0°46'14.0"N, 31°05'17.0"E (Latitude:0.770556; Longitude:31.088056).

Upgrading to bitumen
As far back as 2010, the Uganda government began making plans to tarmac this road. However, by May 2015, work on the road was yet to begin. As at November 2014, bid evaluation was ongoing. The road works are fully funded by the government of Uganda.

Construction
The construction contract was awarded to China Communications Construction Company (CCCC), at a contract price of UGX:484.887 billion (approx. US$132 million). The supervising engineer was a consortium comprising AIC Progetti SPA and Prome Consultants Limited. The construction contract began in February 2016 and was scheduled to be completed in February 2019. Completion was later revised to  23 January 2020.

As of July 2020, the upgrade to class II bitumen standard, with drainage channels, culverts and shoulders had been completed. In September 2021, Allen Kagina, the executive director of UNRA, listed this road among those completed during the financial year 2020/2021 (1 July 2020–30 June 2021).

See also
 List of roads in Uganda
 Economy of Uganda
 Transport in Uganda

References

External links
 Uganda National Road Authority Homepage
 Upcoming UNRA Projects
 Heavy Rains Worsen State of Mubende-Kagadi Road

Roads in Uganda
Mubende District
Kibaale District
Central Region, Uganda
Western Region, Uganda